Daniel Thwaites (1817 – 21 September 1888) was an English brewer and a Conservative Party politician from Blackburn in Lancashire. He owned what is now Thwaites Brewery, and sat in the House of Commons from 1875 to 1880.

He was the son of Daniel Thwaites (1777–1843), an excise man who in 1807 had become one of the three partners of the Eanam Brewery in Blackburn, and sole owner of the business in 1824.
The younger Daniel inherited the business in partnership with two of his brothers, and became sole owner in 1857.

At the 1874 general election, he unsuccessfully contested the borough of Blackburn.
However, he won the seat at a by-election in October 1875 after the death of Henry Master Feilden, and was one of the two Members of Parliament (MPs) for Blackburn until his defeat at the 1880 general election.

Family
In 1859, he married Eliza Amelia Gregory (1824–1907). They had two children, Edward George Duckworth Thwaites who was born on 20 March 1861, but died in the August of the same year and a daughter, Elma Amy (born 30 July 1864), who married Robert Yerburgh, MP for Chester, and inherited the Thwaites Brewery business on the death of her father.

In 1876 he built a large country house, Billinge Scar, on the edge of Blackburn, which passed after his death to Elma and her husband.

References

External links
 

1817 births
Conservative Party (UK) MPs for English constituencies
UK MPs 1874–1880
People from Blackburn
Politics of Blackburn with Darwen
English brewers
1888 deaths
19th-century English businesspeople